H28 may refer to:
 Highway H28 (Ukraine)
 , a Royal Norwegian Navy Draug-class destroyer
 , a Royal Navy H-class submarine
 , a Royal Navy S-class destroyer
 London Buses route H28, a Transport for London contracted bus route
 Whetstone International Airport, on the Canada-US border in Alberta and Montana